Coralloidiomyces is a genus of fungi belonging to the order Rhizophydiales, family unknown.

The species of this genus are found in Denmark.

Species:
 Coralloidiomyces digitatus Letcher

References

Chytridiomycota
Chytridiomycota genera